Black Sheep is a 2018 British short documentary film about black teenager Cornelius and his family moving out of London only to meet with more racism in an Essex estate run by a racist gang. It was released by the British news organization The Guardian.

Reception

Critical response

Accolades
Nominated: Academy Award for Best Documentary (Short Subject) - 91st Academy Awards

References

External links
Black Sheep at The Guardian

Trailer

British short documentary films
2018 short documentary films
Documentary films about racism
2010s English-language films
2010s British films